Cyril Arthur Edge (14 December 1916 – 5 October 1985) was an English cricketer.  Edge was a right-handed batsman who bowled right-arm fast-medium.  He was born at Ashton-under-Lyne, Lancashire.

Edge made his first-class debut for Lancashire against Worcestershire at Old Trafford in the 1936 County Championship.  He made seven further first-class appearances for the county, the last of which came against Essex in the 1938 County Championship.  In his eight first-class appearances for Lancashire, he took 25 wickets at an average of 30.36, with best figures of 4/71.  A poor batsman, he scored just 2 runs from five innings, averaging 0.66.  He also represented the Lancashire Second XI in the Minor Counties Championship, which allowed him to represent a combined Minor Counties team against the touring West Indians at Lord's in 1939.  Batting first, the West Indians made 370 all out, with Edge taking figures of 4/97 from sixteen overs.  The Minor Counties responded in their first-innings by making 310 all out, with Edge himself ending the innings not out on 15, his highest score in first-class cricket.  In their second-innings, the West Indians were reached 138/4, with edge bowling five wicketless overs.  The match ended as a draw.

He died at Ormskirk, Lancashire, on 5 October 1985.

References

External links
Cyril Edge at ESPNcricinfo
Cyril Edge at CricketArchive

1916 births
1985 deaths
Cricketers from Ashton-under-Lyne
English cricketers
Lancashire cricketers
Minor Counties cricketers